The Bugatti Type 53 was a four-wheel drive racing car built by Bugatti in 1932.  The Type 53 was one of the first racing cars to attempt to drive all four wheels, though Ettore Bugatti himself had designed multi-engine all wheel drive vehicles early in his career.

The Type 53 used the  engine from the Type 50 road car fitted to the chassis of the Type 51 racer. It was originally conceived by Giulio Cappa, who created a front wheel drive Grand Prix car in 1926. Cappa's associate, Antonio Pichetto, handled the development of the car while working at Bugatti, starting in 1930. As a result of the elaborate front drivetrain, the Type 53 used the only independent front suspension system ever approved for use by Ettore Bugatti.

The Type 53 was notoriously difficult to steer. At the Type 53's debut in the 1932 Monaco Grand Prix, Albert Divo, noted for his size and strength, was chosen to drive the car, but he gave up during practice after exhausting himself.  In June 1932, Jean Bugatti rolled a Type 53 at the Shelsley Walsh Speed Hill Climb.  The hard steering was attributed to not having constant-velocity joints for the front halfshafts and to unequal-length halfshafts without matching torsional characteristics.  Modern tests, however, have shown the car to be quite tractable at speed.

Robert Benoist then won the 1935 Chateau-Thierry hillclimb in a Type 53, after which the type was retired. Two or three were built.

See also
 Bugatti Type 50
 Bugatti Type 51

References

53